Peter Edward Johnson (born 5 October 1958, in Harrogate) is an English former professional footballer who played as a defender. He currently is a part-time coach of York City under 16s. He made 399 appearances in the Football League for, Middlesbrough, Newcastle United, Bristol City, Doncaster Rovers, Darlington, Crewe Alexandra, Exeter City, Southend United, Gillingham and Peterborough United. At Southend United, he made over 120 appearances. In 1992, he moved to Wycombe Wanderers, at that time, still a non-league club.

References

External links
Peter Johnson Stats at neilbrown.com

1958 births
Living people
English footballers
Gillingham F.C. players
Middlesbrough F.C. players
Newcastle United F.C. players
Bristol City F.C. players
Doncaster Rovers F.C. players
Darlington F.C. players
Crewe Alexandra F.C. players
Exeter City F.C. players
Southend United F.C. players
Peterborough United F.C. players
Wycombe Wanderers F.C. players
Sportspeople from Harrogate
Association football defenders
English Football League players